Félix Fernández García (26 September 1897 – 4 July 1966) was a Spanish actor. He appeared in more than one hundred films from 1942 to 1969.

Filmography

References

External links 

1897 births
1966 deaths
Spanish male film actors